The 9th Paratroopers Assault Regiment "Col Moschin" is an active Special Forces unit of the Italian Army based in Livorno in Tuscany. The regiment is part of the Italian Army's infantry arm's Paracadutisti speciality and assigned to the Army Special Forces Command for training, preparation, doctrinal and procedural development, and the materiel acquisition. Operationally the regiment falls under the Italian Armed Forces' Joint Special Forces Operations Command. The regiment is the only military unit, which has participated in all out-of-area missions of the Italian Army since World War II.

History

World War I 
During the later half of World War I the Royal Italian Army began to form Arditi units modeled after the Imperial German Stormtroopers. Armed with daggers and hand grenades the Arditi were used to clear the Austro-Hungarian trenches. From summer 1917 the army began to form assault units, which consisted of approximately 700 Arditi, for each of its army corps. In May 1918 the regimental depot of the 45th Infantry Regiment (Brigade "Reggio") in Sassari formed the IX Assault Unit, which was assigned to the IX Army Corps.

On 15 June 1918 the Austro-Hungarian Army went on the offensive and began the Second Battle of the Piave River. On 16 June the IX Assault Unit was ordered to retake Italian positions in the Monte Grappa sector, which had been conquered by the Austro-Hungarians the day before. The IX Assault Unit overran the Austro-Hungarians on the summits of Col Fenilon, Col Fagheron, and Col Moschin in a lightning attack and held the summits until Italian infantry could be brought up.

On 20 October 1918 the IX Assault Unit suffered heavy casualties when it stormed Col della Beretta in the Monte Grappa sector as preparation for the decisive Battle of Vittorio Veneto. For its conduct on 15 June and 20 October 1918 the IX Assault Unit was awarded Italy's second-highest military honor the Silver Medal of Military Valour. After the war all Arditi units were disbanded.

World War II

10th Arditi Regiment 
On 15 May 1942 the I Arditi Battalion was formed in Bracciano by the regimental depot of the 82nd Infantry Regiment "Torino". The battalion consisted of the 101st Paratroopers Company, 102nd Watercraft Company (later renamed: 102nd Landing Company), and 103rd Trucks Company (later renamed: 103rd Terrestrial Company). Each company consisted of ten patrols of two officers and ten men each. Advanced training for the paratroopers occurred at the Royal Italian Air Force Paratroopers School Tarquinia, while advanced training for the watercraft personnel occurred at the Royal Italian Navy Divers School in Livorno and at the naval base at Pula. The personnel of the trucks company was trained to take fixed positions or heavily guarded locations. All members of the battalion were also trained in the use of explosives at the Sappers School in Civitavecchia.

On 20 July 1942 the Royal Italian Army General Staff ordered to form an Arditi Regiment, which would consist of a command, regimental services, and at least two Arditi battalions. The regiment was based in Santa Severa and on 1 August the I Arditi Battalion entered the regiment. The regiment was under direct control of the General Staff's Operations Office.

On 20 August the II Arditi Battalion was formed, which consisted of the 111th Paratroopers Company, 112th Watercraft Company (later renamed: 112th Landing Company), and 113th Terrestrial Company. On 15 September the Arditi Regiment was renamed 10th Arditi Regiment. In January 1943 the I Arditi Battalion with the 101st Paratroopers Company and 102nd Landing Company was transferred to Cagliari in Sardinia from where the battalion conducted operations behind allied lines in Algeria and Tunisia. Before the two companies departed for Sardinia each detached two patrols, which were sent to Rhodes and intended to operate against British forces in Cyprus. Meanwhile the 103rd Terrestrial Company was transferred to Tunisia for the Tunisian Campaign, where it arrived on 23 February 1943. The company operated in the desert deep behind enemy lines on reconnaissance and intelligence gathering missions.

On 1 March 1943 the formation of the III Arditi Battalion concluded. The battalion consisted of the 121st Paratroopers Company, 122nd Landing Company, and 123rd Terrestrial Company. In April 1943 the two patrols of the 101st Paratroopers Company returned from Rhodes without having undertaken any missions. On 4 May the 113th Terrestrial Company was transferred to Scordia in Sicily, from where it was intended to operate against allied targets in Tunisia. On 13 May 1943 Axis forces in Tunisia surrendered, including the 103rd Terrestrial Company. One week later, on 20 May 1943, the II Arditi Battalion and the 112th Landing Company were transferred to Sicily, while on 29th May the 123rd Terrestrial Company was transferred to Sardinia and assigned to the I Arditi Battalion to replace the lost 103rd Terrestrial Company.

On 10 June the regiment was reorganized and three new special companies were formed, which consisted of personnel capable of operating behind enemy lines in civilian clothes. The regiment consisted now of the following units:

 10th Arditi Regiment, in Santa Severa
 I Arditi Battalion, in Cagliari (Sardinia)
 102nd Landing Company, 123rd Terrestrial Company, 110th Special Company
 II Arditi Battalion, in Scordia (Sicily)
 112th Landing Company, 113th Terrestrial Company, 120th Special Company
 III Arditi Battalion, in Santa Severa
 122nd Landing Company, 133rd Terrestrial Company, 130th Special Company
 IV Arditi Battalion, in Santa Severa
 101st Paratroopers Company, 111th Paratroopers Company, and 121st Paratroopers Company
 Services Platoon

On 19 1943 June the last personnel returned from Rhodes.

Operations 
The first operation of the regiment occurred on 16-17 January 1943, when a patrol of the 101st Paratroopers Company landed in Algeria on an intelligence gathering mission. In the night of 16 February 1943 a patrol of the same company blew up the railway bridge at Béni Mansour on the Béni Mansour-Bejaïa line. From January to July 1943 the regiment undertook twenty air or sea assaults against railway bridges, airfields, and other objects in Algeria, Tunisia, or Libya. 

On 10 July 1943 allied forces landed on Sicily. Initially the II Arditi Battalion was tasked with rounding up dispersed allied paratroopers, but on 14th July the battalion was moved to the Primosole Bridge across the Simeto river to the South of Catania, where in the night from of the 14-15 July the battalion defeated a British attempt to take the bridge in a surprise attack during Operation Fustian. In the evening of 30 July 1943 the 4th Patrol of the 112th Landing Company embarked at Giardini Naxos on three assault boats of the Royal Italian Navy. The ten Arditi landed behind allied lines at Brucoli from where the patrol hiked inland. After hiding during the day the patrol attacked an allied fuel and ammunition depot, then returned to Italian lines on foot and then by swimming around the English positions at the mouth of the Simeto river. On 13 August the II Aridit Battalion was shipped across the Strait of Messina and returned to Santa Severa. 

On 8 September 1943 the Armistice of Cassibile was announced and the 10th Arditi Regiment split. The 111th Paratroopers Company and 122nd Landing Company fought in the defense of Rome against invading German forces, while the rest of the regiment remained in its barracks. The Germans disbanded the regiment and most of its companies, while the 112th Landing Company and 121st Paratroopers Company joined the fascist National Republican Army of Benito Mussolini.

IX Assault Unit 

On 8 September 1943 the I Arditi Battalion in Sardinia refused German demands to surrender and the battalion resisted on 12 September a German attempt to disarm it. After the German retreat from Sardinia the battalion remained on the island until February 1944, when it was shipped to Naples, where it landed on the 19 of the month. On 20 March the battalion was renamed IX Assault Unit and assigned to the Italian Co-belligerent Army's I Motorized Grouping, which on 18 April 1944 entered the Italian Liberation Corps. The Italian Liberation Corps fought on the allied side in the Italian campaign. Until 25 July 1944 the IX Assault Unit fought at Colli a Volturno, Guardiagrele, Cingoli, and along the Musone and Esino rivers, and in the Battle of Ancona, where the unit achieved the decisive breakthrough of the German line at Casenuove. For its conduct in these battles the IX Assault Unit was awarded its second Silver Medal of Military Valour. 

On 24 September the IX Assault Unit entered the 68th Infantry Regiment "Legnano" as III Battalion "Col Moschin". The battalion  was equipped with British weapons and materiel and consisted of approximately 400 men divided into a command company, three assault companies, and a support weapons company. The 68th Infantry Regiment "Legnano" was assigned to the Combat Group "Legnano", which entered the front on 23 March 1945 as part of the IV US Corps on the river Idice. The combat group fought in the allied Spring Offensive and took part in the Battle of Bologna. For its conduct in these battles the III Battalion "Col Moschin" was awarded the unit's third Silver Medal of Military Valour.

On 1 August 1946 the III Battalion "Col Moschin" was disbanded and its personnel used to form the III Fusiliers Battalion of the 68th Infantry Regiment "Legnano".

Cold War 

On 20 April 1953 a Paratroopers Saboteurs Company was formed by the Italian Army's Infantry School in Cesano. On 1 June 1954 the company was expanded to Paratroopers Saboteurs Unit. On 10 May 1957 the unit moved from Cesano to Pisa and was assigned to the army's Military Parachuting Center there. On 25 September 1961 the unit was renamed Paratroopers Saboteurs Battalion. On 1 January 1963 the Military Parachuting Center was reorganized and renamed Paratroopers Brigade, which on 10 June 1967 was renamed Paratroopers Brigade "Folgore".

During the 1975 army reform the Italian Army disbanded the regimental level and newly independent battalions were granted for the first time their own flags. On 1 October 1975 the Paratroopers Saboteurs Battalion was renamed 9th Paratroopers Assault Battalion "Col Moschin" and assigned the flag and traditions of the 10th Arditi Regiment, and the traditions of the IX Assault Unit. The battalion was assigned to the Paratroopers Brigade "Folgore" and consisted of the following units:

 9th Paratroopers Assault Battalion "Col Moschin"
 Command
 Command and Services Company
 Command and Services Platoon
 Amphibious Platoon
 Transport Platoon
 Assault Company (Recruits Training)
 Command and Services Platoon
 2× Recruits platoons
 2× Assault companies
 6× Operational detachments per company

From September 1982 to November 1983 personnel of the battalion was deployed with the Multinational Force in Lebanon. From May to October 1991 two companies of the battalion and two companies of the 5th Paratroopers Battalion "El Alamein" formed a tactical group, which was deployed to northern Iraq for the American-led Operation Provide Comfort.

Recent times 
From 22 December 1992 to 7 September 1993 personnel of the battalion was deployed to Somalia for the American-led Unified Task Force. After the regiment's return to Italy it was awarded a Gold Medal of Army Valour for the personnel's conduct in Somalia.

On 24 June 1995 the 9th Paratroopers Assault Battalion "Col Moschin" was elevated to regiment and renamed battalion entered the 9th Paratroopers Assault Regiment "Col Moschin". The regiment consisted of a command, a command and services company, the 1st Raiders Battalion, the 101st Paratroopers Assault Company, and the Raiders Training Base.

From 3 July 1996 to 24 March 1997 personnel of the regiment was deployed to Bosnia and Herzegovina for the NATO-led Implementation Force and then Stabilisation Force in Bosnia and Herzegovina. After the regiment's return to Italy it was awarded a Silver Medal of Army Valour for the personnel's conduct in Bosnia and Herzegovina.

On 19 September 2014 the regiment left the Paratroopers Brigade "Folgore" and was assigned to the Army Special Forces Command. In 2022 the regiment moved from Pisa to its new base at Camp Darby near Livorno.

Current structure 

As of January 2023 the 9th Paratroopers Assault Regiment "Col Moschin" consists of:

  Regimental Command, at Camp Darby
 1st Raiders Battalion
 110th Raiders Company
 120th Raiders Company
 130th Raiders Company
 140th Raiders Company
 Operational Support Battalion
 Command and Logistic Support Company
 C4 Company
 Raiders Training Unit
 Raiders Training Base
 101st Recruits Company (Basic Training)
 102nd Recruits Company (Advanced Training)
 Staff and Personnel Office
 Operations, Training and Information Office
 Logistic and Administrative Office

The Command and Logistic Support Company fields the following platoons: C3 Platoon, Transport and Materiel Platoon, Medical Platoon, and Commissariat Platoon. The raiders companies are divided in operational detachments, which consist of: a raider/medic, a raider/breacher (explosives), a raider/EOD-IED deactivator, a raider/Joint Terminal Attack Controller, a raider/information collector and one raider/sniper.

See also 
 Italian Special Forces
 Italian Army: 4th Alpini Paratroopers Regiment
 Italian Army: 185th Paratroopers Reconnaissance Target Acquisition Regiment "Folgore"
 Carabinieri: Gruppo di intervento speciale
 Italian Air Force: 17º Stormo Incursori
 Italian Navy: COMSUBIN

External links
 Italian Army Website: 9° Reggimento d'Assalto Paracadutisti "Col Moschin"

References

Paracadutisti Regiments of Italy
Special forces of Italy
Military special forces regiments